Mezobromelia is a genus of the botanical family Bromeliaceae, subfamily Tillandsioideae. The genus name is for Carl Christian Mez, German botanist (1866-1944). Some authorities treat Mezobromelia as a synonym of Cipuropsis.

The species of this genus are rare in cultivation. They are native to the West Indies and northern South America.

Species

Six species are currently recognised:
 Mezobromelia bicolor L.B. Smith - Colombia, Ecuador
 Mezobromelia capituligera (Grisebach) J.R. Grant - West Indies (Cuba, Hispaniola, Jamaica, Trinidad, Leeward Islands), South America (Venezuela, Colombia, Ecuador, Peru)
 Mezobromelia hospitalis (L.B. Smith) J.R. Grant - Colombia
 Mezobromelia magdalenae (L.B. Smith) J.R. Grant - Colombia
 Mezobromelia pleiosticha (Grisebach) Utley & H.Luther
 Mezobromelia verecunda (L.B.Sm.) Gouda

Species transferred to Gregbrownia:
 Mezobromelia brownii H. Luther = Gregbrownia brownii - Ecuador 
 Mezobromelia fulgens L.B. Smith = Gregbrownia fulgens - Ecuador 
 Mezobromelia hutchisonii (L.B. Smith) W. Weber & L.B. Smith = Gregbrownia hutchisonii - Peru
 Mezobromelia lyman-smithii Rauh & Barthlott = Gregbrownia lyman-smithii'' - Ecuador

References

External links

 BSI Genera Gallery photos
 http://fcbs.org/pictures/Mezobrom.htm

 
Bromeliaceae genera